Oriental Mindoro's 2nd congressional district is one of the two congressional districts of the Philippines in the province of Oriental Mindoro. It has been represented in the House of Representatives since 1987. The district encompasses the province's southern half composed of the municipalities of Bansud, Bongabong, Bulalacao, Gloria, Mansalay, Pinamalayan and Roxas. It is currently represented in the 19th Congress by Alfonso Umali Jr. of the Liberal Party (LP).

Representation history

Election results

2019

2016

2013

2010

See also
Legislative districts of Oriental Mindoro

References

Congressional districts of the Philippines
Politics of Oriental Mindoro
1987 establishments in the Philippines
Congressional districts of Mimaropa
Constituencies established in 1987